Sela nad Podmelcem is a small village in the hills north of Podmelec in the Municipality of Tolmin in the Littoral region of Slovenia.

References

External links
Sela nad Podmelcem on Geopedia

Populated places in the Municipality of Tolmin